Emil Wojtaszek (22 August 1927 – 17 June 2017) was a Polish politician who served as the minister of foreign affairs of the People's Republic of Poland from 1976 to 1980.

Biography
Wojtaszek was born in Krakow on 22 August 1927. He was central committee secretary of the Polish United Workers' party. He was also an alternate member of the party's political committee responsible for foreign affairs.

He served as foreign minister from 2 December 1976 to 24 August 1980. He signed an air service agreement with India on 25 January 1977. He was succeeded by Józef Czyrek in the post. He continued to serve at the party's central committee secretariat for foreign affairs after leaving the office. His term at the committee ended in April 1981 during the protests in the country. He also resigned from the Sejm in February 1982. The same year he was appointed ambassador of Poland to Italy.

Wojtaszek died in Warsaw on 17 June 2017 aged 89. He was buried in Powązki Military Cemetery, Warsaw.

References

External links

1927 births
2017 deaths
Commanders of the Order of Polonia Restituta
Diplomats of the Polish People's Republic
Knights of the Order of Polonia Restituta
Members of the Central Committee of the Polish United Workers' Party
Members of the Polish Sejm 1980–1985
Ministers of Foreign Affairs of Poland
Officers of the Order of Polonia Restituta
People from Kraków Voivodeship (1919–1939)
Polish Workers' Party politicians
Politicians from Kraków
Recipients of the Order of the Banner of Work
Ambassadors of Poland to Italy